A field trip is a journey by a group of people to a place away from their normal environment, usually for education, personal enrichment, or research purposes.

Field trip may also refer to:

Music 
 Field Trip (band), a rock band from Pleasanton, California
 Field Trip (album), a 2000 album by Canadian folk rock band The Grapes of Wrath
 Field Trip, a 1954 album by Irish folk singer Sarah Makem
 Fieldtrip (album), a 1998 album by Quebec hard rock group GrimSkunk
 Field Trip, an album by the New Riders of the Purple sage originally released as Veneta, Oregon, 8/27/72
 "Field Trip", a song by Melanie Martinez from her 2020 deluxe album K-12

Television 
 Inspector Gadget's Field Trip, a spin-off incarnation of the animated series Inspector Gadget
 "Field Trip" (How I Met Your Mother), a seventh season episode of the CBS sitcom How I Met Your Mother
 "Field Trip" (The X-Files), a sixth-season episode of the science fiction series The X-Files
 "The Field Trip", a second series episode of the British sitcom The Inbetweeners
 "Field Trip", a season 1 episode of Hey Arnold!
 "Field Trip", a season 1 episode of Ultimate Spider-Man

Information technology 
 Field Trip (application), a mobile augmented reality application by Niantic Labs
 FieldTrip, a MATLAB software toolbox for magnetoencephalography (MEG) and electroencephalography (EEG) analysis